Jenny Lynn Shimizu (born June 16, 1967) is an American model and actress.

Early life
Shimizu was born in San Jose, California, and raised in Santa Maria.

Career 
While working as a mechanic, Shimizu was approached to model for the Calvin Klein CK1 fragrance ads and model Calvin Klein fashions. She later was featured in the Banana Republic "American Beauty" campaign.

She became the first Asian model to walk for the highly influential catwalk Prada and also became the first minority model to open the show.

Shimizu was one of the stars of Foxfire, alongside Angelina Jolie. She also had a supporting role in Jamie Babbit's 2007 film Itty Bitty Titty Committee. Shimizu appeared in the third season of the Here TV original series Dante's Cove.

In 2005, Shimizu appeared on Tyra Banks's reality show America's Next Top Model. She appeared in season two of Bravo TV's Make Me a Supermodel as a member of the judging panel.

Personal life 
In the mid-1990s, Shimizu had a romantic relationship with Angelina Jolie, which Jolie confirmed in a 1997 interview when she said, "I fell in love with her the first second I saw her. I would probably have married Jenny if I hadn't married my [first] husband (Jonny Lee Miller)."

In 2005, to protest against America's laws on gay marriage, Shimizu took part in a staged wedding ceremony with Rebecca Loos on the Sky documentary Power Lesbian UK (broadcast as Power Lesbians on LOGO in the U.S.). The two had a relationship for a period thereafter.

In 2012, Shimizu met Michelle Harper at a party. They married in August 2014.

References

External links 
 
 
 
 

1967 births
American female models
American actresses of Japanese descent
American models of Japanese descent
American lesbian actresses
LGBT models
Living people
Actresses from Los Angeles
People from Santa Maria, California
People from San Jose, California
Actresses from San Jose, California
American LGBT people of Asian descent
LGBT people from California
21st-century American women